Florian Conz (born 20 October 1984) is a Swiss ice hockey player. He is currently playing with Lausanne HC of the Swiss National League A.

Conz made his National League A debut playing with Lausanne HC during the 2003–04 NLA season.

References

External links

1984 births
Living people
Genève-Servette HC players
Lausanne HC players
Swiss ice hockey centres